Two Deaths is a 1995 British drama film directed by Nicolas Roeg and starring Michael Gambon, Sônia Braga, and Patrick Malahide. The film premiered at the Toronto International Film Festival in 1995 before having a wider release in 1996.

Premise
On the eve of the 1989 revolution in Romania, Dr. Daniel Pavenic (Gambon) sits down to dinner with some friends and discusses his past and his obsession with his housekeeper. His shocking honesty eventually leads to his guests also disclosing some of their own secrets.

Cast
Michael Gambon.....Daniel Pavenic
Sônia Braga.....Ana Puscasu
Patrick Malahide.....George Bucsan
Ion Caramitru.....Carl Dalakis
Nickolas Grace.....Marius Vernescu
John Shrapnel.....Cinca
Ravil Isyanov.....Lieutenant
Andrew Tiernan.....Captain Jorgu
Sevilla Delofski.....Elena
Matthew Terdre.....Leon
Lisa Orgolini.....Young Ana

Dorich House in Kingston Vale, South West London, was used as the filming location for Pavenic's house.

References

External links

 

1995 films
1995 drama films
Films directed by Nicolas Roeg
Films scored by Hans Zimmer
British drama films
Films based on American novels
Works about the Romanian Revolution
1990s English-language films
1990s British films